Tera Mujhse Hai Pehle Ka Naata Koi is an Indian drama television series.

Plot

21-year old Tashi has grown up in the lush valleys and mountains of Manali. Brought up by her father Adheer Singh after her mother's demise, she idolizes him. She believes in textbook romances inspired by her father's devotion to her mother Rohini who he still loves, seventeen years after her death. She helps her father with his restaurant business.

Tashi's best friend is Rohan and they have grown up inseparable from each other. However, a whirlwind romance with a handsome stranger, Arjun, leads to a hurried marriage and then she stumbles upon a lie that Arjun had told her - that he does not have a family. Tashi realizes that she has married into a royal family from Rajasthan - a family shrouded in mystery and hiding dark secrets.

Soon enough, Tashi discovers the murky truth about her in-laws and most importantly a curse that threatens to shatter her present and future. She finds herself trusting and mistrusting almost everyone around her.

In the face of such extreme adversities, Tashi discovers courage to take on the might of evil and emerges victorious in her bid to save herself, her husband and her unborn child.

Cast
Janvi Chheda as Tashi
Mahesh Thakur as Adheer Singh, Tashi's father
 Karan Hukku as Arjun Singh, Tashi's husband
 Kunal Verma as Rohan, Tashi's best friend

References

External links
Tera Mujhse Hai Pehle Ka Naata Koi Official Site on Sony TV India

Sony Entertainment Television original programming
Indian drama television series
2010 Indian television series debuts
2011 Indian television series endings